Wang Lei is the name of:

Wang Lei (mountaineer), first Chinese woman who has climbed the Seven Summits and skied to both North Pole and South Pole
Wang Lei (basketball) (born 1986), Chinese professional basketball player
Wang Lei (chess player) (born 1975), Chinese woman grandmaster chess player
Wang Lei (fencer) (born 1981), world champion in fencing
Wang Lei (figure skater) (born 1988), Chinese figure skater
Wang Lei (Go player) (born 1977), professional go player
Wang Lei (canoeist) (born 1981), Chinese sprint canoer
Wang Lei (footballer) (born 1995), Chinese footballer